Tommy Vann Helms (born May 5, 1941) is an American former professional baseball player and manager. Over a 14-year Major League Baseball career (–), Helms played for four teams, including eight seasons with the Cincinnati Reds, four with the Houston Astros, and one each with the Pittsburgh Pirates and Boston Red Sox. He also managed the Reds for part of two seasons (–). He is the uncle of former Major League player Wes Helms.

MLB career
He appeared briefly with the Reds in 1964, making his major league debut on September 23, 1964, against the Philadelphia Phillies with one plate appearance that year. He also had a short stint with the Reds in 1965, with 46 plate appearances. On September 1, 1965, during a doubleheader, Helms went 4–4 with two triples. A natural shortstop, Helms was moved to third base by the Reds his rookie season with Leo Cárdenas firmly entrenched at short. Helms clubbed nine home runs, batted .284, and provided sparkling defense at his new position to earn the 1966 National League Rookie of the Year.

In , the Reds shuffled their line-up, moving budding superstar Tony Pérez to third, Helms to second, and Pete Rose from second base to left field. The Reds moved to Riverfront Stadium on June 30, 1970, where Helms hit the first Reds home run on July 1. Helms started all five games of the 1970 World Series, with four hits and one walk in 19 plate appearances as the Reds fell to the Baltimore Orioles.

During his Gold Glove season of 1971, Helms set a Reds record turning 130 double plays. He led National League second basemen in double plays in 1969 and 1971, fielding percentage in 1970, 1971 and 1974 and assists in 1972.

In his autobiography, Charlie Metro shares this anecdote about Morganna "The Kissing Bandit" and Helms: "At first the players were shy and would kind of run.  But after a while, heck, the guys all loved it.  One time in Cincinnati, she ran out there toward Tommy Helms.  She ran right out beyond the infield, and Tommy was the type of guy who wouldn't run from her.  He just opened up his arms and said, 'Come here, baby.'"

On November 29, 1971, Helms was part of a blockbuster trade that brought Joe Morgan, Denis Menke, César Gerónimo, Ed Armbrister and Jack Billingham from the Houston Astros for Helms, Lee May and Jimmy Stewart. After four seasons in Houston, Helms was traded to the Pittsburgh Pirates prior to the start of the  season. He was purchased by the Oakland A's following the season, and actually traded back to the Pirates, along with Chris Batton and Phil Garner for Tony Armas, Doug Bair, Dave Giusti, Rick Langford, Doc Medich and Mitchell Page during spring training the following season.

Shortly after reacquiring him, the Pirates released Helms. He signed with the Boston Red Sox for the remainder of the 1977 season, serving primarily as a designated hitter before calling it a career. During his 14 years in a major league uniform, Helms struck out only 301 times in almost 5,000 at bats. Former Reds closer Clay Carroll was once asked, "Who would you want at second base when the game was on line?"  He promptly responded, "Two words, Tommy Helms."

Career statistics
In 1435 games over 14 seasons, Helms compiled a .269 batting average (1342-for-4997) with 414 runs, 223 doubles, 21 triples, 34 home runs, 477 RBI, 231 bases on balls, 301 strikeouts, .300 on-base percentage and .342 slugging percentage. Defensively, he recorded a .980 fielding percentage at second base, third base and shortstop.

Managerial career
On April 30, during a home game against the New York Mets, and following a call by umpire Dave Pallone which allowed the Mets' eventual winning run to score in the 6–5 game, Rose argued vehemently and made physical contact with the umpire, noticeably pushing him. National League president A. Bartlett Giamatti suspended Rose for 30 days. Helms served as manager of the Reds during Rose's suspension and led the team to a 12–15 record.

On August 24, 1989, following accusations that he had gambled on baseball, Rose voluntarily accepted a permanent place on baseball's ineligible list, and Helms again replaced Rose as Reds manager. The Reds went 16-21 under Helms. He was replaced at the end of the season by Lou Piniella. He later managed the Chicago Cubs Southern League affiliate Charlotte Knights in 1990 and the Atlantic City Surf of the independent Atlantic League in 2000 and 2001.

Personal life
Helms was born May 5, 1941, in Charlotte, North Carolina and was a 1959 graduate of West Mecklenburg High School. He signed with the Reds at age 18. He served in the U.S. Marine Corps beginning in October 1963. Following his service, Helms started his Major League Baseball career.

After retirement he lived in North Carolina and later in Cincinnati. From 1990 to 1992, his son Tommy Helms Jr. played in the Chicago Cubs organization, and his son Ryan Helms played in 1994 and 1995 in the Chicago White Sox organization.

In 2013, Tommy Helms was inducted into the North Carolina Sports Hall of Fame.

References

External links

Tommy Helms at SABR (Baseball BioProject)
Tommy Helms at Pura Pelota (Venezuelan Professional Baseball League)

1941 births
Living people
Baseball players from Charlotte, North Carolina
Boston Red Sox players
Cincinnati Reds managers
Cincinnati Reds coaches
Cincinnati Reds players
Florida Instructional League Reds players
Gold Glove Award winners
Houston Astros players
Macon Peaches players
Major League Baseball Rookie of the Year Award winners
Major League Baseball second basemen
National League All-Stars
Navegantes del Magallanes players
American expatriate baseball players in Venezuela
Palatka Redlegs players
Pittsburgh Pirates players
San Diego Padres (minor league) players
Topeka Reds players